Mitchell County Courthouse in Beloit, Kansas is a Richardsonian Romanesque building built during 1900–1901.  It was designed by J.C. Holland. It was listed on the National Register of Historic Places in 1977.

References

External links

Courthouses on the National Register of Historic Places in Kansas
Buildings and structures in Mitchell County, Kansas
County courthouses in Kansas
Government buildings completed in 1901
Richardsonian Romanesque architecture in Kansas
National Register of Historic Places in Mitchell County, Kansas